, sometimes credited as , is a Japanese animation studio founded on December 13, 1978, by former Mushi Pro members.

Works

TV series

1980s
Touch (1985–1987) (production assistance; animated by Group TAC)
High School! Kimengumi (1985–1987) (production assistance; animated by Studio Comet)
The Three Musketeers Anime (1987–1989) (animation cooperation with Sei Young Animation)
Kiteretsu Daihyakka (1988–1996)
 (1989–1990)
Miracle Giants Dome-kun (1989–1990)

1990s
Tanken Goblin Tou (1990–1991)
 (1990–1991)
Genji Tsūshin Agedama (1991–1992)
 (1992–1993)
Hime-chan's Ribbon (1992–1993)
Akazukin Chacha (1994–1995)
Nurse Angel Ririka SOS (1995–1996)
Rurouni Kenshin (1996–1997) (first 66 episodes; later animated by Studio Deen)
Kodocha (1996–1998)
Kochira Katsushika-ku Kameari Kōen-mae Hashutsujo (regular broadcast: 1996–2004; special broadcast: 2005–2008; last special episode: 2016)
Anime television de Hakken! Tamagotchi (1997–1998)
Initial D: First Stage (1998) (animation cooperation with Studio Comet)
Ojarumaru (1998–present)

2000s
Transformers: Car Robots (2000)
Yu-Gi-Oh! Duel Monsters (2000–2004)
Forza Hidemaru (2002)
Legendz Yomigaeru Ryūō Densetsu (2004–2005)
Morizo to Kikkoro (2004–2005)
Yu-Gi-Oh! GX (2004–2008)
Animal Yokocho (2005–2006)
Eyeshield 21 (2005–2008)
Hataraki Man (2006)
Yu-Gi-Oh! 5D's (2008–2011)
Mainichi Kaasan (2009–2011, first 96 episodes; later animated by TYO Animations)

2010s
Yu-Gi-Oh! Zexal (2011–2014)
Yu-Gi-Oh! Arc-V (2014–2017)
Yu-Gi-Oh! VRAINS (2017–2019)
Bakutsuri Bar Hunter (2018–2019) (animation cooperation with Toei Animation)

2020s
Fushigi Dagashiya Zenitendō (2022–present) (animation cooperation with Toei Animation; episode 53 onwards)
Me & Roboco (2022–present)

Original video animations
Prefectural Earth Defense Force (1986)
Mugen Shinshi Bōken Katsugeki-hen (1987)
Maps: Densetsu no Samayoeru Seijintachi (1987)
 (1987)
To-y (1987) 
One Pound Gospel (1988)
 (1990–1991) (episodes 1–2, 5–6, 9–10)

Films
The Three Musketeers Anime: Aramis' Adventure (1989)
Rurouni Kenshin: The Motion Picture (1997)
Kochira Katsushika-ku Kameari Kōen-mae Hashutsujo the Movie (1999)
Kochira Katsushika-ku Kameari Kōen-mae Hashutsujo the Movie 2: UFO Shūrai! Tornado Daisakusen!! (2003)
Yu-Gi-Oh! The Movie: Pyramid of Light (2004)
Kawa no Hikari (2009)
Yu-Gi-Oh!: Bonds Beyond Time (2010)
Yu-Gi-Oh!: The Dark Side of Dimensions (2016)
Survive! Inside the Human Body (2020) (animation cooperation with Toei Animation)
Shinkai no Survival! (2021) (animation cooperation with Toei Animation)

References

External links
 Official website 
 

 
Animation studios in Tokyo
Japanese animation studios
Nerima
Mass media companies established in 1978
Japanese companies established in 1978